Ludovic Bernard  is a French film director, and second unit director. He is best known for his 2017 film, L'ascension.

Filmography

References

External links
IMDb
Allociné

Living people
French film directors
Year of birth missing (living people)